Saru Limbu (Nepali: सरु लिम्बु; born 06 March 1999) is a Nepali footballer who plays as a midfielder for Nepal A.P.F. Club and the Nepali Women's National Team.

Early life 
Growing up in her home town in Morang District, Limbu used to watch local football matches, and her friends and cousins influenced her to play football. Her talent was noticed by a teacher who contacted football coach Bikram Dhimal. After watching her play, Dhimal took her to Urlabari where she joined the local New Star Club. Playing for New Star she attracted the attention of bigger clubs including Nepal A.P.F. Club.

Club career 
In 2016, APF offered her a contract. Initially, Limbu's family did not want her to go, but, as it was a departmental team where she would have more than just a football job, her family agreed. When she joined APF, key players such as Anu Lama and Sajana Rana were injured, so Limbu got an immediate chance to play. After a dominant performance in the Chief of Army Staff Cup, she was called up to Nepal women's national football team. After consistently performing well at club level and in closed camps, she was selected for Nepal's squad for the 2016 SAFF Women's Championship.

In March 2021, Limbu was one of four Nepal national team players recruited to play in the 2021 edition of Pakistan's National Women Football Championship, for Masha United in Karachi. The side finished top of its group, scoring 60 goals in four matches. These included a 19-0 win over Sialkot (Limbu scoring 10 goals), a 4-0 triumph over Higher Education Commission, a 35-0 victory over Karachi (Limbu again scoring 10), and a 2-2 draw with Karachi United. They reached the semi-finals before the tournament was cancelled.

She returned to play in Nepal's domestic league for Nepal A.P.F. Club.

International career 
Limbu captained Nepal's under-18 women's team at the SAFF U-18 Championship in Bhutan.

International goals

Achievements

References 

1999 births
Living people
People from Morang District
Nepalese women's footballers
Nepal women's international footballers
Women's association football forwards
South Asian Games silver medalists for Nepal
South Asian Games medalists in football